Atomic chess is a chess variant. Standard rules of chess apply, but all captures result in an "explosion" through which all surrounding white and black pieces other than pawns are removed from play. Some variations additionally remove rules concerning check such that the king may be able to move into or remain in check.

History
In 1995 the German Internet Chess Server (GICS) introduced the game, based on rules one of its users collected from friends who played offline. It was soon after incorporated into the Middle East Wild Internet Server (MEWIS) and other smaller servers before being implemented at Chess Live and Internet Chess Club in 2000, Free Internet Chess Server in 2003 and Lichess in 2015. It was added to Chess.com in late 2020. In 2021, 4.9 million atomic chess games were played on Lichess. Lichess also hosts 24-hour tournaments called "Atomic Revolution" with cash prizes where 8 thousand people participated in the 2022 edition.

It has garnered serious attention from  chess grandmasters with Andrew Tang reaching quarterfinals and Jeffery Xiong reaching semifinals of Atomic Chess Championship 2017 hosted on Lichess, where both got knocked out by GM Arka50 who has won the championship in 2017, 2018 and 2020 whereas he did not participate in 2019 and 2021 editions.

Rules and variations
Rules of atomic chess are the same as standard chess with a few important differences concerning capturing, check, and winning conditions.

Capturing
In a capture in standard chess, the captured piece is removed from the board, and the capturing piece takes its place. In atomic chess, a capture causes an "explosion" through which both pieces are removed from the board as well as all non-pawn pieces in the eight squares immediately surrounding the capture. Pawns are removed only when capturing, captured directly, or promoted. In case of en passant, the explosion occurs on the square to which the capturing pawn would have moved. Captures that result in the explosion of a player's own king are illegal; therefore, a king can never capture.

Check

Threats to the king can be direct or indirect. Putting a king in check is a direct attack and is sometimes called "atomic check". An indirect threat occurs when a player threatens to explode the king by capturing an adjacent piece. In most variations of atomic chess, players must respond to being checked in a similar way they would in traditional chess—by moving the king out of check, blocking the check, or removing the checking piece—but an exception exists when the checked player can win the game by exploding the checking player's king.

As the king cannot take another piece, it is possible to move the kings next to each other without a check occurring or to escape check. This possibility is often used by a losing player to defensively position his king next to his opponent's at endgame, hoping for a draw. Depending on the board setup, this strategy is sometimes optimal and allows the draw to be forced. At other times, a player can counter by forcing a win with a position such that a piece or pawn can be exploded next to their opponent's king without blowing up their own king, or they can force the opposing king away using their king and the remaining pieces on the board, which will typically result in a loss for the retreating king.

The variant of atomic chess played at the Internet Chess Club is one that does not enforce check at all, making legal any move, even one leaving the king to be captured directly in the next move.

Winning conditions
In all variations of atomic chess, a player wins by exploding the king of the opposite color without exploding their own king. This is usually done by capturing a piece on a square adjacent to the opponent's king or putting a queen next to the king which results in checkmate since a king cannot take any piece.

In variations that require a response to being checked, it is possible to checkmate an opponent to win the game, creating a situation in which a king is directly threatened and cannot make a legal move. This is sometimes called "atomic checkmate". It is likewise possible for the game to end in stalemate if a king is not directly threatened and no legal moves are possible.

When typical rules of check are not enforced, victory is only attained via the explosion of the enemy king. In these variations without check, the king may be forced into check and thus capture through zugzwang.

Strategy

The first-move advantage enjoyed by White is much greater in this game than in standard chess. However, no attempts to prove a win for White have been successful.

Material sacrifices are more common in atomic chess than in chess. In the opening and middlegame, it is common to offer a piece in order to open spaces to seize an initiative.

Opening

White has the initiative in atomic chess, and many openings begin with a quick attempt to explode Black's d-, e-, or f-pawns. For this reason, atomic openings are fraught with traps, and Black may have to respond precisely to defend. Several common traps begin with 1.Nf3 followed by Ng5 or Ne5, forcing Black to start with 1..f6 to maintain rough equality. Games between experienced players follow more traditional opening principles, such as piece , controlling , and winning .

Endgame

As with atomic opening theory, a small amount of endgame theory and analyses have been published online by strong players.

A common scenario in atomic endgames is to have two kings on adjacent squares. As a player cannot intentionally blow up their own king, a king can never capture another piece, including another king. Similarly, because a capture affects all adjacent squares, one king cannot be captured directly if it means destruction of the other. Moving one king towards the other is thus a strategy to achieve a draw. The player with the advantage must then maneuver into a position where a non-king piece can be captured that is adjacent to one king but not the other. If there is no piece that can be captured, the player with the advantage can promote two queens and force the opponent into zugzwang and therefore forcing the opponent's king away from their king. Creative use of zugzwang is a common tactic to force a win in these situations.

The Internet Chess Club variation of atomic chess ignores check completely, and thus leads to different outcomes in certain situations. For example, a king and rook vs. king endgame that would be a draw under normal circumstances can become a forced win on ICC.

See also
 List of chess variants

Other chess variants based on explosions
 Beirut Chess
 Stratomic

References

External links
 Vlasov's Atomic Chess Homepage - Homepage created in the mid-1990s by a player involved with atomic's earliest implementation at GICS. Its most prominent feature is its attempt an opening book that covers many of the most common openings and traps. However, several of the ideas have been improved upon or refuted in the years since publication.
 Molten Thinker Atomic Page - Covers some tactical and endgame theory, including diagrams and puzzles.
 Nick Long's Atomic Page - Covers the game's variations, its role on different chess servers, lists of strong players, and other historical information.
 Leonard Blackburn - Several documents and videos on the rules of atomic, openings, sample games, and a detailed paper on endgames.
- The atomic rule page on Lichess.

Chess variants